Zbigniew Jan Pietrzykowski (4 October 1934 – 19 May 2014) was a Polish boxer.

He took part in three Olympic Games, each time winning a medal. He won a bronze medal at Melbourne 1956 in the light middleweight division, after losing in the semi-final to Hungarian László Papp. Four years later in Rome, he reached the final of the light heavyweight division, where he lost to Cassius Clay, who was 7 years younger. Finally, he won a bronze medal in Tokyo in 1964, in the light heavyweight division (defeated by Soviet Aleksei Kiselyov).

He participated five times at the European Amateur Boxing Championships and won five medals: a bronze in the light middleweight division in Warsaw 1953, and then four gold medals: in West Berlin (1955) in the light middleweight division, in Prague (1957) in the middleweight division, in Lucerne (1959), and in Moscow (1963) in the light heavyweight division.

He won the championship of Poland 11 times: in the light middleweight division in 1954, 1955 and 1956, in the middleweight division in 1957 and in the light heavyweight division in 1959, 1960, 1961, 1962, 1963, 1964 and 1965.

Pietrzykowski was also a champion in relation to his performances in the national Polish team fighting 44 bouts, winning 42 of them and losing twice.
In his career, he fought 350 bouts winning 334 of them, drawing 2 and losing 14.

Pietrzykowski was the first winner of the Aleksander Reksza Boxing Award in 1986.

1956 Olympic results
 Round of 16: defeated Richard Karpov (Soviet Union) on points
 Quarterfinal: defeated Boris Nikolov (Bulgaria) on points
 Semifinal: lost to Laszlo Papp (Hungary) on points (was awarded bronze medal)

1960 Olympic results
 Round of 32:  defeated Carl Crawford (British Guiana) on points, 5-0
 Round of 16:  defeated Emil Willer (Germany) on points, 5-0
 Quarterfinal:  defeated Petar Spasov (Bulgaria) on points, 5-0
 Semifinal:  defeated Giulio Saraudi (Italy) on points, 5-0
 Final: lost to Muhammad Ali (then known as Cassius Clay) (USA) on points, 0-5 (was awarded the silver medal)

1964 Olympic results
 Round one: bye
 Round two: defeated Ronald Holmes (Jamaica) disqualified
 Quarterfinal: defeated Rafael Gargiulo (Argentina) on points, 5-0
 Semifinal: lost to Aleksei Kiselyov (Soviet Union) 1-4 (was awarded bronze medal)

References

External links

1934 births
2014 deaths
Boxers at the 1956 Summer Olympics
Boxers at the 1960 Summer Olympics
Boxers at the 1964 Summer Olympics
Olympic boxers of Poland
Medalists at the 1956 Summer Olympics
Medalists at the 1960 Summer Olympics
Medalists at the 1964 Summer Olympics
Olympic medalists in boxing
Olympic silver medalists for Poland
Olympic bronze medalists for Poland
Sportspeople from Silesian Voivodeship
People from Bielsko County
Polish male boxers
Light-heavyweight boxers
21st-century Polish people
20th-century Polish people